Acacia leptoneura, also known as the slender nerved acacia, is a shrub of the genus Acacia and the subgenus Plurinerves. It is native to a small area in the Wheatbelt region of Western Australia.

Description
The shrub has terete branchlets that are covered in short stiff hairs and subpersistent stipules. Phyllodes shallowly to strongly incurved or sigmoid, like most species of Acacia it has phyllodes rather than true leaves.

Taxonomy
The species was first formally described by the botanist George Bentham in 1842 as a part of the William Jackson Hooker work Notes on Mimoseae, with a synopsis of species as published in the London Journal of Botany. It was reclassified as Racosperma leptoneurum in 2003 by Leslie Pedley then returned to genus Acacia in 2006.
It is quite similar in appearance to Acacia subflexuosa but has double the number of nerves on the phyllodes.

Distribution
The species has an extremely limited distribution as in confined to a small roadside area to the north east of the town of Dowerin. There are two main populations, the first is found on a low rise on  growing in a sandy loamy soils over laterite in a mostly cleared area of shrubland where it is associated with Hakea scoparia and Santalum acuminatum. The second population is growing in a sandy-loamy soil atop a low ridge composed of laterite as part of an open mallee shrubland community containing Allocasuarina acutivalvis, Allocasuarina campestris and Melaleuca coronicarpa.

See also
 List of Acacia species

References

leptoneura
Acacias of Western Australia
Taxa named by George Bentham